Harold Stephen Black (April 14, 1898 – December 11, 1983) was an American electrical engineer, who revolutionized the field of applied electronics by discovering the negative feedback amplifier in 1927. To some, his discovery is considered the most important breakthrough of the twentieth century in the field of electronics, since it has a wide area of application. This is because all electronic devices (vacuum tubes, bipolar transistors and MOS transistors) are inherently nonlinear, but they can be made substantially linear with the application of negative feedback. Negative feedback works by sacrificing gain for higher linearity (or in other words, smaller distortion/intermodulation). By sacrificing gain, it also has an additional effect of increasing the bandwidth of the amplifier. However, a negative feedback amplifier can be unstable such that it may oscillate. Once the stability problem is solved, the negative feedback amplifier is extremely useful in the field of electronics. Black published a famous paper, Stabilized feedback amplifiers, in 1934.

Biography 
He was born in Leominster, Massachusetts in 1898. He went to Worcester Polytechnic Institute (WPI) for his first degree. Subsequently, he received a B.S.S. in Electrical Engineering from WPI in 1921 and then joined Western Electric, which was the manufacturing arm of AT&T.  He joined Bell Labs (1925), where he was a member of technical staff until his retirement (1963).

Black started writing his autobiography with the tentative title "Before the ferry docked". However, he died in December 1983 at age 85 before he could finish it.

Work 
Amplifiers are unavoidably non-linear. Therefore, every time a signal is amplified in a telecommunications network, which can happen dozens of times in a circuit, noise and distortion are added.  Black first invented the feed-forward amplifier which compares the input and output signals and then negatively amplifies the distortion and combines the two signals, canceling out some of the distortion.  This amplifier design improved, but did not solve, the problems of transcontinental telecommunication.

After years of work Black invented the negative feedback amplifier which uses negative feedback to reduce the gain of a high-gain, non-linear amplifier and makes it act as a low-gain, linear amplifier with much lower noise and distortion.  The Negative feedback amplifier allowed Bell system to reduce overcrowding of lines and extend its long-distance network by means of carrier telephony. It enabled the design of accurate fire-control systems in World War II, and it formed the basis of early operational amplifiers, as well as precise, variable-frequency audio oscillators.

According to Black he got his inspiration to invent the negative feedback amplifier when he was traveling from New Jersey to New York City by taking a ferry to cross the Hudson River in August 1927.  Having nothing to write on he sketched his thoughts on a misprinted page of the New York Times and then signed and dated it. At that time, Bell Laboratories headquarters were located in 463 West Street, Manhattan, New York City instead of New Jersey and he lived in New Jersey such that he took the ferry every morning to go to work.

Fifty years after his 1927 invention, he published an article in IEEE Spectrum regarding the historical background of his invention. He published a classical paper on negative feedback amplifier in 1934, which has been re-printed in the Proceedings of IEEE two times in 1984 and 1999 Inside his 1934 classical paper "Stabilized feed-back amplifiers", he mentioned Harry Nyquist's work on stability criterion because a negative feedback amplifier can be unstable and oscillate. Thus, with the help of Nyquist's theory, he managed to demonstrate a stable negative feedback amplifier which can be used in reality. Bernard Friedland wrote an introduction for the 1999 re-print in Proc. IEEE. James E. Brittain wrote about him in 1997.
An obituary regarding Black was published by IEEE Transactions on Automatic Control in 1984.

He also worked on pulse-code modulation and wrote a book on "Modulation Theory" (Van Nostrand, 1953). He held many patents the most famous of which was US Patent 2,102,671 "Wave Translation System", which was issued to Bell Laboratories in 1937, covering the negative feedback amplifier.

Awards 
National Inventors Hall of Fame inductee number 25, 1981
Robert H. Goddard Award from WPI 1981
AIEE Lamme Medal 1958
D. Eng. degree (honorary) from WPI  1955
Research Corporation Scientific Award 1952
John H. Potts Memorial Award of the Audio Engineering Society
John Price Wetherill Medal of the Franklin Institute
Certificate of Appreciation from the US War Department.
WPI gives away the annual Harold S. Black Scholarship (1992-)

References

External links 
 Harold S. Black Papers at WPI

1898 births
1983 deaths
People from Leominster, Massachusetts
Control theorists
Cyberneticists
American electrical engineers
20th-century American inventors
Worcester Polytechnic Institute alumni
Scientists at Bell Labs
IEEE Lamme Medal recipients